Central High School, also known as High School of Columbus and High School of Commerce, was a four-year secondary school (grades 9–12) located  in Franklinton, Columbus, Ohio. It was a part of Columbus City Schools (at the time Columbus Public Schools). The last building was located at 75 South Washington Boulevard and opened in 1924. Prior to that, Central High School was located Downtown at East Broad and Sixth streets from 1862 until 1924.

The school building operated on South Washington Boulevard closed in June 1982. In 1999, the school's historic façade was incorporated into the Center of Science and Industry (COSI), a science center designed by renowned architect Arata Isozaki. Isozaki used the high school's 1924 exterior facing downtown as its east entrance; a balance to the facility's progressively futuristic west entrance. On March 7, 1985, it was added to the National Register of Historic Places. It is considered part of the Columbus Civic Center Historic District.

History

Central was one of the original 6 high schools in Columbus Public Schools. The other five were North, South, East, West and Linden McKinley, of which only South, East, West and Linden McKinley remain open. North High School (not to be confused with Northland, which opened in 1965 and remains open) suffered the same fate as Central only 3 years before, closing in 1979.

From 1862 to c. 1928, North High School was located at Broad and Sixth Street, current site of the Capital University Law School. It was considered an architectural ornament for Columbus, and featured a 150-ft.-tall tower. The site was purchased in 1859 and construction was underway from 1860 to 1861, with a cost of $23,400. The school opened in the following fall term. It was originally able to house 300 students, increased as expansions opened in following years. The building was designed by architect Nathan B. Kelley.

Athletics

Ohio High School Athletic Association team state championships

 Baseball – 1929
 Boys' Golf – 1937
 Boys' Track and Field – 1927, 1928, 1929, 1930
 Boys' Gymnastics - 1929

Notable alumni
George Bellows, American realist painter, known for his depictions of urban life in New York City
Howard Cassady, Heisman Trophy winner of 1955 for the Ohio State University; professional football player for the Detroit Lions, Cleveland Browns and Philadelphia Eagles and baseball coach for the Columbus Clippers.
Harold Cooper, Franklin County Commissioner, President of the Columbus Jets and the International League 
Fred Cornell, author of Carmen Ohio
Bob Kline, former MLB player (Boston Red Sox, Philadelphia Athletics, Washington Senators)
Dave Roberts, Major League Baseball pitcher
Dom Sigillo, American football player
Mose Solomon, the "Rabbi of Swat," Major League Baseball player
Ernie Wheelwright, American football player and actor

Closing 
Because of declining enrollment in the school district and deterioration of the building, Central was closed following the 1981–1982 school year in June 1982 and never opened again.

Teachers (film) 

After its closure, Central High School was used as a shooting location for scenes in the 1984 satirical dark comedy-drama film Teachers. The movie depicted a fictional school, "John F. Kennedy High School," where, as a key element of the storyline, students received passing grades even though they couldn't read. Columbus Public Schools rented the building to the filmmakers, but did not review the script or know at the time how the fictional school in the movie would be depicted. Although the fictional school depicted in Teachers wasn't set in Columbus, CPS still took the storyline of the movie as a discredit to the school district.

COSI 
Columbus Public Schools sold the building to the City of Columbus for $15 million in 1988.  In July 1994, Columbus City Council granted COSI Columbus a 28-year lease on the building. COSI remodeled portions of it for the new site of a museum. Most of the front of the school remains facing the river. The new addition sits on what was the football field of the school.

On November 6, 1999 COSI Columbus moved into the old Central High School building.

See also

 National Register of Historic Places listings in Columbus, Ohio
 Schools in Columbus, Ohio

References

External links

 Columbus High School History 1847-1910

School buildings on the National Register of Historic Places in Ohio
Defunct schools in Ohio
High schools in Columbus, Ohio
Public high schools in Ohio
National Register of Historic Places in Columbus, Ohio
1862 establishments in Ohio
Columbus Register properties